These are the US number one albums of 2009, per the Billboard 200. Note that Billboard publishes charts with an issue date approximately 7–10 days in advance. Fearless, the second studio album by American country singer-songwriter Taylor Swift, was the best selling album of 2009, and ended atop the Billboard 200 year-end chart of the year.

Chart history

References 

2009
United States Albums